Kullervo Sets Off for War is a painting by Akseli Gallen-Kallela from the year 1901. He painted the subject in tempera painting (89 × 128 cm) and as a fresco (355 × 687 cm) which is located in the music hall of Old Student House of Helsinki University.

Description

The fresco was donated to the Students' union by Otto Donner.

The theme for the painting is from the Kalevala, national epic of Finland. Kullervo sits on a white horse ready to ride to war, to take revenge on his uncle Untamo. He is followed by a dog or a wolf.

Gallen-Kallela traveled to Siena, Italy, where he likely saw the frescoes by Simone Martini in the Palazzo Pubblico. Martini's Equestrian portrait probably gave Gallen-Kallela inspiration for the setting of Kullervo.

Gallery

References

Paintings by Akseli Gallen-Kallela
1901 paintings
Paintings in the collection of the Ateneum
Mythological paintings
Horses in art
Works based on the Kalevala